Henrik Aarrestad Uldalen (born 1986 in South Korea, but raised in Asker Norway) is a Norwegian oil painter. Uldalen is a self-taught artist whose work includes classic figurative painting.  He paints people in oils and then pieces these images in impossible scenes such as climbing upside down spiral staircases, or falling from tilted buildings. His work has been described as photosurrealism.

Although he uses a various range of models in his work, he states that they are all representations of himself and his state of mind. When he sets up the painting he tries to get the model to evoke the same emotions that he is going through at the moment. His works serve as a diary that records his different states of being from different moments in time.

Paintguide 

Uldalen and co-founders set-up Paintguide in January 2014. The project started as a forum for artists from all over the world to share their favourite artworks and inspirations to the public, the project took form as a website, and Instagram. Following a highly successful takeover of the Paintguide account by Alex Kanevsky, Uldalen found himself inundated with requests for Paintguide takeovers from other like-minded, social media savvy artists. Contributed by over 60 artists and painters, the Paintguide’s following grew exponentially, and currently stands over 329,000 followers.

In November 2015, the Paintguide project took form as a pop-up exhibition at Unit London gallery. Showing over 60 artists from their Paintguide Instagram account, such as Jeremy Geddes, Jeremy Mann, Martin Wittfooth, Greg “Craola” Simkins and Dan Quintana. Alongside the exhibition being set up, Uldalen set-up a Kickstarter campaign for the Paintguide book, showcasing the 60 first artists who took over the Instagram page, displaying 5 of their favourite artworks. It was successfully funded on 28 November.

Exhibitions

Solo exhibitions

 2021	JD Malat Gallery. "Love in Exile". London, UK
 2018	JD Malat Gallery. London, UK
 2014	Thinkspace. Los Angeles, USA
 2011	Galerie Contour. Skagen, Denmark
 2010	Galleri Ramfjord. Oslo, Norway
 2009	Galleri Ramfjord. Oslo, Norway

Group exhibitions

 2021  Spring Gardens Flats. “NuArt Aberdeen”. Aberdeen, Scotland
 2015	Friends Of Leon Gallery. “Les Petit Fours”. Sydney, AU
 2015	Gallery 1261. “Unfurl”. Denver, USA
 2015	Inner State Gallery. “LAX/DTW”. Detroit, USA
 2015	Galleri Ramfjord. “Scope Art Show”. New York, USA
 2015	LA Municipal Art Gallery. “20 Years Under The Influence of Juxtapoz”. Los Angeles, USA
 2015	Modern Eden. “Platinum Blend”. San Francisco, USA
 2015	Hashimoto Contemporary. “The Moleskine Project 4”. San Francisco, USA
 2014	Arcadia Contemporary. “Scope Art Fair”. New York, USA
 2014	Thinkspace. “LA Art Show”. Los Angeles, USA
 2014	Arcadia Contemporary. “LA Art Show”. Los Angeles, USA
 2014	Arcadia Contemporary. New York, USA
 2014	Thinkspace. Los Angeles, USA
 2013	Corey Helford Gallery. “Art Collector Starter Kit”. Los Angeles, USA
 2013	Gallery 1261. “Contemporary Realism”. Denver, USA
 2013	Thinkspace. Los Angeles, USA
 2012	Galleri Ramfjord. Oslo, Norway
 2012	NOo Sphere Arts. “Beautiful Maladies”. New York, USA
 2012	Spoke Art. San Francisco, USA
 2012	J. LeVine Gallery. “Art Basel”, Switzerland
 2012	Thinkspace. Los Angeles, USA
 2012	Stricoff Fine Art. New York, USA
 2011	Galleri Ramfjord. Oslo, Norway
 2011	S Cube Gallery. Los Angeles, USA
 2011	.NO New York. New York, USA
 2011	Galleri V58. “Magic Realism”. Århus, Denmark
 2010	Galerie Contour. Skagen, Denmark
 2010	Galleri Ramfjord. Oslo, Norway

References

10. NuArt Aberdeen, street art, 2021
https://2021.nuartaberdeen.co.uk/news/henrik-uldalen-crafts-granite-inspired-masterpiece-in-aberdeen/

External links
 Official Website
 The paintguide Instagram

Artists from Oslo
21st-century Norwegian painters
Norwegian male painters
1986 births
Living people
21st-century Norwegian male artists